Thoasia is a genus of beetle in the family Carabidae. It was once classified as a monotypic genus with the species Thoasia rugifrons, however recently three new species was found.

Species
Thoasia rugifrons Liebke, 1939 - French Guiana, Venezuela.
Thoasia surinamensis Erwin & Aldebron, 2018 - Suriname.
Thoasia pterosmaragdos Aldebron & Erwin, 2018 - French Guiana.
Thoasia manu Erwin & Aldebron, 2018 - Ecuador, Perú

References

Lebiinae